The Netherlands Football League Championship 1922–1923 was contested by 43 teams participating in four divisions. The national champion would be determined by a play-off featuring the winners of the eastern, northern, southern and western football division of the Netherlands. RCH won this year's championship by beating Be Quick 1887, Go Ahead, and Willem II.

New entrants
Eerste Klasse East:
Promoted from 2nd Division: Enschedese Boys
Eerste Klasse North:
Promoted from 2nd Division: LVV Friesland
Eerste Klasse South:
Promoted from 2nd Division: FC Eindhoven
Eerste Klasse West:
Promoted from 2nd Division: HC & CV Quick & Sparta Rotterdam

Divisions

Eerste Klasse East

Eerste Klasse North

Eerste Klasse South

Eerste Klasse West

Championship play-off

References
RSSSF Netherlands Football League Championships 1898-1954
RSSSF Eerste Klasse Oost
RSSSF Eerste Klasse Noord
RSSSF Eerste Klasse Zuid
RSSSF Eerste Klasse West

Netherlands Football League Championship seasons
1922–23 in Dutch football
Netherlands